The Samsung Wave (or Samsung Wave GT-S8500) is a smartphone developed and produced by Samsung Electronics. It is the first smartphone to run the Bada operating system developed by Samsung Electronics, which was commercially released on May 24, 2010. The Wave is a touchscreen phone powered by Samsung's "Hummingbird" CPU (S5PC110), which includes 1 GHz ARM Cortex-A8 CPU and a built-in PowerVR SGX 540 graphics engine. It also has a "Super AMOLED" screen and 720p high-definition video capture capabilities. Due to shortage of Super AMOLED screens, Samsung released a successor to the device called Wave II and ceased production of the original S8500 model.

Specifications

Screen
The screen is a  capacitive touchscreen Super AMOLED with an anti-smudge oleophobic coating on top of the scratch-resistant tempered-glass ( Gorilla Glass Display ). The screen resolution is 800x480 WVGA with 283 PPI.

Processor
The phone features a 1 GHz SoC, which internally contains an ARM Cortex A8 CPU core, the same model as Apple's A4 processor. The graphics engine of the device is a PowerVR SGX 540 GPU which is said to be capable of generating 90 million triangles per second (same as the SoC used on the Samsung Galaxy S).

Camera
The phone features a 5 megapixel EDOF camera which supports 2560 x 1920 pixels, along with autofocus, LED flash, Geo-tagging, face and blink detection, image stabilization, touch focus, etc.  Shooting modes include beauty shot, smile shot, continuous, panorama and vintage shot. As a camcorder it is able to shoot HD recording (1280x720) at 30 FPS with flash. As well as this, it is also able to record slow motion video (320x240) at 120 FPS with flash.

Operating system
The Wave was the first phone with Samsung's own Linux based Operating System, Bada, meaning "Ocean". Samsung worked on the later versions of Bada 1.2 and later 2.0. Bada 1.2 was released to the world in a phased manner as it was designed to improve stability.

In January 2012, Samsung declared that it was planning to merge Bada with the Linux-based Tizen operating system that was developed in collaboration with Intel. Despite the collaboration, was not supported by the Wave.

Unofficial ports of Android were made due to the restrictions and the eventual cease in development of Bada. Versions ported include Android Froyo, Gingerbread, Ice Cream Sandwich, Jellybean, KitKat, Lollipop and Marshmallow.

Other features
Other features include A-GPS, 2 GB/8 GB of internal storage with a microSDHC slot for an additional 32 GB. It also has a magnetometer (compass), a proximity sensor, an accelerometer, 5.1-channel surround sound Mobile Theater, music recognition, a fake call service, smart search, Social Hub and it is the first phone to support Bluetooth version 3.0.

Radio connectivity includes Bluetooth 3.0, Wi-Fi 802.11 b/g/n and HSDPA 3.6 Mbit/s.

This phone is available with both European/Asian 3G bandings and the North American 3G bandings. The North American 3G bandings version of the phone is a limited availability and is not available in the US.

Software features

User interface
The phone is the first smartphone to feature the Samsung Bada operating system platform. The UI is Samsung's own Touch-wiz 3.0. Touch-wiz 3.0, like the two predecessors (Touch-wiz 2.0 and Touch-wiz), utilizes widgets. The three most notable widgets pre-installed in Touch-wiz 3.0 are Daily Briefing (which includes all essential information such as weather, finance, AP mobile news and schedule), Feeds and Updates and Buddies now (which allows users to call, send texts to and read Facebook/Twitter feeds off their favorite contacts). Users are allowed to have up to 10 home screens to add widgets.

Applications
For Internet browsing the Samsung Wave has the Dolphin Browser v2.0 (based on WebKit) (or 3.0 depends by the firmware version). This browser supports Flash, but it is disabled by default to improve page loading speed.

By default, the phone comes with Picsel Viewer which is capable of reading .PDF and Microsoft Office file formats. Users from selected countries can buy and download Picsel Office Editor from Samsung Apps.

As for Samsung Apps, users can also download applications, games and widgets from the application store.

Other software includes the GPS software that comes with this phone (LBS Route 66), Facebook, Twitter, social hub, mini diary, daily briefing, memo, video player, FM radio, media browser, voice recorder, e-mail and pre-installed Asphalt 5.

Media support
The Samsung Wave supports MP3, AAC, AAC+, e-AAC+, WMA, AMR, WAV, MP4, MPEG4, H.263, H.264, WMV, FLV, DivX, XviD, MKV and FLAC file formats. It also supports subtitles.

Bada 2.0 support
In many countries at the end of December 2011, the operating system was gradually updated to Bada 2.0. The first official Bada 2.0 version was LA1.

With Bada 2.0, the TouchWiz UI reached version 4.0, the GUI was completely redone, and included many new features, such as full multitasking, WAC, voice commands, text-to-speech, speech-to-text, ChatON, Caster, a new version of DLNA, social apps and the new Dolphin 3.0 browser with a download manager.

Android porting

Due to many owners of the phone disliking the Bada software many people have worked on porting the popular Android O.S to the Wave. The ported versions known are Froyo, Gingerbread, Ice Cream Sandwich, Jelly Bean and Kitkat. However they are still being developed and some features, such as GPS, may be limited or not function as intended.

See also 

 Exynos - Samsung
Amoled - Samsung

References

External links
Facebook Samsung Wave page
Official Samsung Wave website
Samsung Mobile Wave website
Reviews: 
Phonearena.com review by PhoneArena Team, 04 Jun 2010
GSMArena.com review by GSMArena team, 01 June 2010
Forums:
MySamsungWave
SamsungWaveForum

Bada (operating system)
s-8500
Mobile phones introduced in 2010
Mobile phones with user-replaceable battery
Discontinued smartphones